Pennisetum  is a widespread genus of plants in the grass family, native to tropical and warm temperate regions of the world. They are known commonly as fountaingrasses (fountain grasses). Pennisetum is considered a synonym of Cenchrus in Kew's Plants of the World Online.

Taxonomy
Pennisetum is closely related to the genus Cenchrus, and the boundary between them is unclear. Cenchrus was derived from Pennisetum and the two are grouped in a monophyletic clade.<ref>Ozias-Akins, P., et al. (2003). Molecular characterization of the genomic region linked with apomixis in Pennisetum/Cenchrus. Functional & Integrative Genomics, 3(3), 94-104.</ref> Some species now in Pennisetum were once members of Cenchrus, and some have been moved back. A main morphological character used to distinguish them is the degree of fusion of the bristles in the inflorescence, but this is often unreliable. In 2010, researchers proposed to transfer Pennisetum into Cenchrus, along with the related genus Odontelytrum. The genus is currently not accepted as separate from Cenchrus in Kew's Plants of the World Online database.

Species

The World Checklist of Selected Plant Families lists the following species as synonyms of Cenchrus:

Description
As currently envisioned, Pennisetum is a genus of 80 to 140 species. The various species are native to Africa, Asia, Australia, and Latin America, with some of them widely naturalized in Europe and North America, as well as on various oceanic islands.

They are annual or perennial grasses. Some are petite while others can produce stems up to 8 meters tall. The inflorescence is a very dense, narrow panicle containing fascicles of spikelets interspersed with bristles. There are three kinds of bristle, and some species have all three, while others do not. Some bristles are coated in hairs, sometimes long, showy, plumelike hairs that inspired the genus name, the Latin penna ("feather") and seta ("bristle").

Uses
The genus includes pearl millet (P. glaucum), an important food crop. Napier grass (P. purpureum) is used for grazing livestock in Africa.

Several species are cultivated as ornamental plants, notably P. advena, P. alopecuroides, P. orientale, P. setaceum, and P. villosum.
The cultivar “Fairy Tails’ is a recipient of the Royal Horticultural Society’s Award of Garden Merit.

Ecology

Many Pennisetum grasses are noxious weeds, including feathertop grass (P. villosum) and kikuyu grass (P. clandestinum), which is also a popular and hardy turf grass in some parts of the world.

The herbage and seeds of these grasses are food for herbivores, such as the chestnut-breasted mannikin (Lonchura castaneothorax), the caterpillar of the butterfly Melanitis phedima, and the larvae of the fly genus Delia.

The genus is a host of the pathogenic fungus Cochliobolus sativus''.

References

 
Poaceae genera